Pyrausta subsequalis, also known as the weedfield sable, is a moth in the family Crambidae. It was described by Achille Guenée in 1854. It is found in much of North America, where it has been recorded from southern Alberta and southern British Columbia south to Arizona and New Mexico and east to Florida and north to Ontario. The habitat consists of dry prairie areas.

The wingspan is 14–18 mm. The ground color of the forewings and hindwings is fulvous brown with dull yellowish-buff postmedial and subterminal lines. Adults have been recorded on wing from July to early September. In coastal areas of California, they are seen year-round.

Subspecies
Pyrausta subsequalis subsequalis
Pyrausta subsequalis petaluma Munroe, 1976 (California, Oregon)

Notes

Moths described in 1854
subsequalis
Moths of North America